John C. Brasher (died September 1, 1998) was an American judge and politician. He served as a Republican member of the Florida House of Representatives.

Life and career 
Brasher served in the United States Army Air Forces during World War II as a pilot. He was a municipal judge and a member of the Port Richey, Florida Port Richey City Council serving for two terms, before becoming mayor of Port Richey.

In 1966, Brasher was elected to the Florida House of Representatives, winning a special election after defeating Tommy Stevens. He served until 1967.

Brasher died in September 1998 at his home in Gallant, Alabama, at the age of 80.

References 

Year of birth missing
1998 deaths
Republican Party members of the Florida House of Representatives
20th-century American politicians
Mayors of places in Florida
Florida state court judges
20th-century American judges